Buck's horn plantain is a common name for several plants and may refer to:

 Plantago lanceolata
 Plantago coronopus